MV James R. Barker is an American bulk carrier that operates on the upper four North American Great Lakes. Like the MV Mesabi Miner, a ship of the same design, it is owned and operated by the Interlake Steamship Company and was named for Interlake’s Chairman of the Board, James R. Barker.

The MV James R. Barker is the third vessel of that size to be built. There are fourteen vessels that are restricted to the upper lakes because they are too large to travel through the Welland Canal that connects Lake Erie to the lowest lake, Lake Ontario.

In spite of their size, these two vessels are able to maneuver in harbor without requiring assistance from tugboats.

External links
 Official MV James R. Barker Webpage

References

Great Lakes freighters
1976 ships
Ships built in Lorain, Ohio